Hořice is a town in the Hradec Králové Region of the Czech Republic.

Hořice may also refer to places in the Czech Republic:

Hořice (Pelhřimov District), a municipality and village in the Vysočina Region
Hořice na Šumavě, a municipality and village in the South Bohemian Region
Dolní Hořice, a municipality and village in the South Bohemian Region
Horní Hořice, a village and part of Dolní Hořice, South Bohemian Region
Hořice, a village and part of Blansko, South Moravian Region
Hořice, a village and part of Spálené Poříčí, Plzeň Region